Waadhoeke is a municipality of Friesland in the northern Netherlands. It was established 1 January 2018 and consists of the former municipalities of Franekeradeel, het Bildt, Menameradiel and parts of Littenseradiel, all four of which were dissolved on the same day. 

The municipality is located in the province of Friesland, in the north of the Netherlands. Waadhoeke is bordered by Harlingen, Terschelling, Ferwerderadiel, Leeuwarden and Súdwest-Fryslân. The population in January 2019 was 46,133. It is Friesland's sixth-most-populous municipality. The largest population centre (2018 population, 12,793) is Franeker. The residents speak Dutch, West Frisian or Bildts (a dialect in the former municipality het Bildt).

Etymology
The municipality is named after the Wadden Sea. The municipality is a part or corner of the province of Friesland.

Population centres

The municipality consists of 41 settlements of which Franeker is the seat of government. 

Source: Waadhoeke.nl

Not including the village Ritsumazijl and also a small part of the village Alde Leie lays within in the municipality.

Hamlets
Within the municipality Waadhoeke there are the hamlets; 't Heechhout, Arkens, Barrum, Bonkwert, De Kampen, De Oasterein, De Puollen, De Vlaren, Doijum, Dykshoek, Dyksterhuzen, Fatum, Franjumerbourren, Hatsum, Holprijp, Kie, Kiesterzijl, Kingmatille, Kleaster Anjum, Koehoal, Koum, Laakwerd, Lutjelollum, Miedum, Nieuwebildtzijl, Oosthoek, Rewert (partially), Roptasyl (partially), Salverd, Skyldum, Sopsum, Stad Niks, Tallum, Teetlum, Tolsum, Tritzum, Tsjeppenbûr, Vrouwbuurtstermolen (partially), War, Weakens, Westerein and Zwarte Haan.

Transport
A section of the A31 bypasses the towns of Franeker and Dronryp. 

Trains operated by Arriva provide passenger services on the Harlingen–Nieuweschans railway, with stops in Franeker, Dronryp and Deinum.

Van Harinxmakanaal is a major canal. It runs along the places Franeker, Dronryp and Deinum.

Notable people

Public thinking & Public Service 

 Sixtinus Amama (1593 in Franeker – 1629) a Dutch Reformed theologian and orientalist 
 Tjerk Hiddes de Vries (1622 in Sexbierum - 1666) a Dutch admiral 
 Sicco van Goslinga (1664 in Herbaijum - 1731) a Dutch statesman and diplomat
 François Hemsterhuis (1721 in Franeker - 1790) a writer on aesthetics and moral philosophy 
 Johan Valckenaer (1759 in Franeker - 1821) a Dutch lawyer, patriot and diplomat. 
 Michael Jan de Goeje (1836 in Dronryp - 1909), a Dutch orientalist focusing on Arabia and Islam
 Dirk Boonstra (1893 in Sint Annaparochie – 1944) a police commander and World War II hero
 Jelle Zijlstra (1918 in Oosterbierum - 2001), politician, Prime Minister of the Netherlands 1966/1967
 Jacob Klapwijk (born 1933 in Dronryp) a Dutch philosopher and academic 
 Aucke van der Werff (born 1953) a Dutch politician, Mayor of het Bildt, 2003/2010
 Pia Dijkstra (born 1954 in Franeker) a Dutch politician and former TV news presenter

Science 

 Johan Sems (1572 in Franeker - 1635) a Dutch cartographer, engineer and land surveyor
 Eise Eisinga (1744 in Dronryp - 1828) an amateur astronomer 
 Adolphus Ypey (1749 in Franeker - 1822) a Dutch botanist
 Sebald Justinus Brugmans (1763 in Franeker - 1819),  botanist and physician
 Jan Oort  (1900 in Franeker - 1992) a Dutch astronomer of the Milky Way
 Rein Strikwerda (1930 in Franeker – 2006) a Dutch orthopedic surgeon of footballers
 Johan Bouma (born 1940 in Vrouwenparochie) a Dutch soil scientist

The Arts 

 Jacobus Mancadan (ca.1602 in Minnertsga – 1680) a Dutch Golden Age painter of pastoral landscapes
 Anna Maria van Schurman (1607-1678), painter, engraver and poet
 Jan Jansz. de Stomme (1615 in Franeker – 1658) a Dutch Golden Age portrait painter
 Lawrence Alma-Tadema (1836 in Dronryp - 1912), painter

Sport 
 Sippie Tigchelaar (born 1952 in Franeker) a retired speed skater, competed at the 1972 Winter Olympics
 Tjalling van den Bosch (born 1958 in Achlum) a powerlifter, strongman, and Highland Games athlete
 Petronella de Jong (born 1970 in Sint Jacobiparochie) a sailor, competed at the 2004 Summer Olympics

References

External links

 
Municipalities of Friesland
Municipalities of the Netherlands established in 2018